Montesano sulla Marcellana (colloquially named Montesano) is a town and comune of the province of Salerno in the Campania region of south-west Italy.

Etymology
It is said that the inhabitants of "Marcellinum", the lower area of the current town, went over the hill to escape from the unhealthy air caused by marshes and plague. The new town, founded around the year 1000, was therefore called "Montesano", namely "healthy mountain", to underline the healthiness of its air and water sources. The toponym "sulla Marcellana" ("over Marcellana") results from the original place "Marcellinum".

Geography
Located in the south of Campania, at the borders with Basilicata, Montesano is the easternmost municipality of its region. Its territory, part of the Vallo di Diano, is included in the Cilento, Vallo di Diano and Alburni National Park.

The municipality borders with Buonabitacolo, Casalbuono, Grumento Nova, Lagonegro, Moliterno, Padula, Sanza and Tramutola. It counts the hamlets (frazioni) of Arenabianca, Cessuta, Magorno, Montesano Scalo, Prato Comune and Tardiano.

Natural areas 
The vast municipal territory is made up of valleys, hills, and mountains.
"Cerreta-Cognola" regional park is a wonderful green oasis which hosts a large wood of centuries-old trees. Indeed, Montesano boasts 4000 hectares of forest area, one of the largest in Vallo di Diano. Located between Montesano Scalo, Buonabitacolo, Casalbuono and Sanza, the park houses various wild animal species which are almost disappeared, such as wild boars, fallow deer, roe deer and mouflons.

Climate
Montesano presents a warm temperate climate, humid in the lower area and dry in the upper area. It is characterised by short winters with low temperatures in the highland area and by warm summers.

Main sights
The main sights of the town include various churches and monasteries, such as: Santa Maria of Cadossa Abbey, ex Capuchin monastery, Santa Maria of Loreto church, etc. One of the most impressive church is Sant’Anna church, a majestic neo-gothic building located in the main square of the town. It was built between 1954 and 1959 at the behest of Filippo Gagliardi (Montesano sulla Marcellana, 25 February 1912 – Roma, 15 January 1968), an inhabitant of Montesano who left his native place in search of fortune in Venezuela. After he prospered and became rich, he came back to Montesano to help poor people by giving them money and houses.

Economy
The economy is primarily based on agriculture and handicraft. Livestock farming allows the production of meat and milk. In the town, there is also a factory for the bottling of mineral water.

Twin towns
 Villa Mercedes, Argentina

See also
Cilento
Cilentan dialect

References

External links

 Official website 
Civic Museum of Montesano 

Cities and towns in Campania
Localities of Cilento